Dimas can refer to:

Saint Dismas, also known as Saint Dimas - the Good Thief at Jesus's crucifixion
Dimas (surname), Greek, Portuguese and Spanish surname.
Dimas Delgado (born 1983), Spanish footballer
Dimas Gonçalves de Oliveira (born 1984), Brazilian footballer
Dimas Teixeira (born 1969), Portuguese footballer
Al-Dimas, a town in Syria

See also 
Dima (disambiguation)